Geranium maculatum, the wild geranium, spotted geranium, or wood geranium, is a perennial plant native to woodland in eastern North America, from southern Manitoba and southwestern Quebec south to Alabama and Georgia and west to Oklahoma and South Dakota.

Names
It is known as spotted cranesbill or wild cranesbill in Europe, but the wood cranesbill is another plant, the related G. sylvaticum (a European native called "woodland geranium" in North America). Colloquial names are alum root, alum bloom and old maid's nightcap.

Distribution
It grows in dry to moist woods and is normally abundant when found.

Description

They are deeply parted into three or five divisions, each of which is again cleft and toothed.

In the Northern Hemisphere, they appear from April to June (precise dates depend on the latitude). They are grouped in loose corymbs or umbels of two to five at the top of the flower stems.

It is covered with scars, showing the remains of stems of previous years' growth. When dry it has a somewhat purplish color internally.

Cultivation

The plant is well-known in cultivation, and numerous cultivars have been developed. The cultivar 'Elizabeth Ann' has gained the Royal Horticultural Society's Award of Garden Merit.

Other uses
The plant has been used in herbal medicine, and is also grown as a garden plant. Wild geranium is considered an astringent, a substance that causes contraction of the tissues and stops bleeding. The Mesquakie Indians brewed a root tea for toothache and for painful nerves and mashed the roots for treating hemorrhoids.

References

maculatum
Flora of North America
Plants used in traditional Native American medicine
Plants described in 1753
Taxa named by Carl Linnaeus